The 2007 Pittsburgh RiverRats season was the 1st season for the American Indoor Football Association (AIFA) franchise.
The Explosion began play in 2007 as the Pittsburgh RiverRats, playing that season's home games at the Rostraver Ice Garden in Rostraver Township, Pennsylvania. The "RiverRats" name and logo were originally supposed to be used by the Reading Express, but that team chose the Express branding instead, freeing it up for use by another American Indoor Football League (AIFL) team. In August 2006, more arguments came about the RiverRats name as a team in the Eastern Indoor Football League, called the 3 River Rats, had intentions of suing the RiverRats to retain the naming rights of the team.

On August 20, 2006, the RiverRats signed quarterback David Dinkins, formerly of the Erie Freeze of the AIFA, and designated him as the team's franchise player for the 2007 season.

The RiverRats played their first game on February 3, 2007 on the road in Tupelo, MS, but lost 54-34 to the Mississippi Mudcats. Their first home game was on February 18, 2007 which they lost 35-28 to the Reading Express. Pittsburgh won its first home game by beating the Danville Demolition 47-21 on March 4, 2007, and then won its first away game by beating Danville a second time, on March 9, 2007, by a score of 34-29. On May 19, 2007, the RiverRats set an AIFA single game record when they scored 86 points in a single game.

The team finished their inaugural season at a respectable 7-7 record, good for fourth place in the Northern Conference and a wild-card playoff berth. However, the RiverRats were eliminated in the first round, losing 42-24 to the eventual conference champions Reading Express.

Schedule

Regular season

Standings

 Green indicates clinched playoff berth
 Purple indicates division champion
 Grey indicates best league record

References

Erie Explosion seasons
2007 in sports in Pennsylvania
2007 in American football